The Palakkad–Pollachi line is a railway line between Palakkad and Pollachi in the states of Kerala and Tamil Nadu, India.

Status 
The line was functioning completely between Palakkad Junction and Palakkad Town. The section of the line between Palakkad Town and Pollachi completed safety testing on 2 October 2015.

The safety inspection that followed conversion of the track was completed on 7 October 2015. The line was approved for passenger train services by the Commissioner of Railway Safety on 8 October 2015.

Traffic will be greatly affected in Palakkad and neighboring towns when the rail line is reopened. Because there will be many trains using the route, more overpasses will need to be built.

On 25 October, a load tolerance test was conducted with a train with 42 wagons carrying 3,720 tonnes of fertiliser and goods services resumed. Passenger services resumed on 16 November.

Gauge
As of 2015, the Palakkad–Pollachi line is a  broad gauge railway line.

Before the conversion which was completed in April 2015, the line was formerly partly 1676 mm-gauge (Palakkad Junction to Palakkad Town) and partly , between Palakkad Junction and Pollachi Junction.

Rolling stock 
Rolling stock :
WAP-4
WAG-7
WDM-2
WDG-3
WDP-3
WDM-3
WDP-4D

Historic rolling stock:
YDM-4

Stations
 — electrified
 — electrified
 

Annamalai Road (S.G. Pudur)

Image gallery

References

 
5 ft 6 in gauge railways in India

1898 establishments in India
Railway lines opened in 1898